Pardina can refer to:
 Pardina, Tulcea, commune in Romania, principal village also Pardina
 Pardillo, Spanish wine grape grown in Western Spain, also known as Pardina
 Cayetana blanca, Spanish wine grape grown in Southern Spain, also known as Pardina
 4914 Pardina, main belt asteroid

See also 
Pardinas (disambiguation)